The Olean Oilers were a minor league baseball team located in Olean, New York which played primarily in the New York–Pennsylvania League from 1939 to 1966, with a hiatus in 1960. Starting in 1959, the team shared nicknames with its major league affiliates.

A 2012 collegiate team with the same name played in the New York Collegiate Baseball League for several years. Both teams played their home games at Bradner Stadium.

History

Professional team 
The Oilers were preceded in minor league play by the Olean Refiners. Between 1908 and 1916, The Refiners played as members of the Class D level Interstate League.

The Oilers resumed minor league play, playing in the New York–Pennsylvania League from 1939 to 1951 and from 1955 to 1958. The league was known as the Pennsylvania–Ontario–New York League from 1939 to 1956. Their inaugural home game on 11 May 1939 was played in front of 3,300 spectators.

The Oilers were a minor league affiliate of the Brooklyn Dodgers from 1939 to 1948, the St. Louis Browns in 1949, and the Philadelphia Phillies from 1956 to 1958. The Oilers played their home games at Bradner Stadium.

The Oilers' president, Josephine Ross, was the only female president of an affiliated minor league team in 1959.

Collegiate summer team 
Starting in 2012, the Olean Oilers name was revived as a member of the New York Collegiate Baseball League. The team began play in the summer of 2012, initially playing on the campus of Saint Bonaventure University before returning to a renovated Bradner Stadium in 2014; a crowd of nearly 2,000 fans watched the Oilers during their first game back at Bradner. In their fourth year of play as an amateur squad, the Oilers won the 2015 NYCBL championship; the next year, the team went on a 24-game winning streak near the beginning of the season, doubling the previous league record, en route to a league record 39 wins and a second consecutive championship, won before a league record 2,876 fans at Bradner. Despite concerns over competitive balance as well as admitted discussions with the Perfect Game Collegiate Baseball League, the Oilers have shown a general preference to stay in the NYCBL for 2017.

Year-by-year professional record

Notable alumni

 Mike Andrews (1962) MLB All-Star
 Ralph Branca (1943) 3 x MLB All-Star
 Jim Coates (1951) 2 x MLB All-Star
 Hal Gregg (1941) MLB All-Star
 Jim Hannan (1961)
 Ken Harrelson (1959) MLB All-Star
 Gene Hermanski (1941)
 Bob Montgomery (1962)
 Bobby Morgan (1944)
 Danny Ozark (1942)
 Paul Owens (1951, 1955-1957)
 Bobby Richardson (1953) 8 x MLB All-Star; 1960 World Series Most Valuable Player
 Andre Rodgers (1954)
 Stan Rojek (1939)
 Mike Ryan (1961)
 José Santiago (1959) MLB All-Star
 Dick Stigman (1955) 2 x MLB All-Star

References

External links
Olean - Baseball Reference
Official site of the current team

This article is based on the "Olean Oilers" article at Baseball-Reference.com Bullpen. The Bullpen is a wiki, and its content is available under the GNU Free Documentation License.

Defunct baseball teams in New York (state)
Defunct minor league baseball teams
Amateur baseball teams in New York (state)
Defunct New York–Penn League teams
Boston Red Sox minor league affiliates
New York Yankees minor league affiliates
Kansas City Athletics minor league affiliates
New York Giants minor league affiliates
Brooklyn Dodgers minor league affiliates
Philadelphia Phillies minor league affiliates
St. Louis Browns minor league affiliates
Baseball teams established in 1939
Baseball teams disestablished in 1962
1939 establishments in New York (state)
1962 disestablishments in New York (state)
Cattaraugus County, New York